Áldás is the eighth studio album of the Hungarian folk metal band Dalriada. It was released in September 2015 on Hammer Music. Áldás peaked at number 2 in the Hungarian Albums Chart.

Track listing

 *Both "Dózsa rongyosa" and "Úri toborzó" tell about the rebellion led by György Dózsa and the end of Úri Toborzó refers to the Battle of Mohács.

Personnel
Dalriada
 Laura Binder – vocals
 András Ficzek – vocals, guitars
 Mátyás Németh-Szabó – guitar
 István Molnár – bass
 Gergely Szabó – keyboards, backing vocals
 Ádám Csete – flutes, bagpipe
 Tadeusz Rieckmann – drums, harsh vocals, backing vocals

Additional and session musicians
 Attila Fajkusz – violin, tambourine, backing vocals
 Ernő Szőke – doublebass
 Gergely Szőke – viola, lute, acoustic guitars

References

2015 albums
Dalriada (band) albums